Picador Travel Classics is a series of 17 hard-cover books published by Picador during the 1990s. All of the titles are re-prints of what the publishers thought of as "classic" travel literature. Travel literature scholars Holland and Huggan say it is part of a trend in the late 20th century to canonize the travel literature genre, "This is a series that partly announces the classic status - the canonicity - of its volumes through their hardback covers, their introductions and their numbering - it is intended to form a library."

Series

Notes

Travel books
Series of books